Mikhail Agafonov is a Russian tenor singer who was born in Moscow and was a graduate of Lunatscharsky Academy for Performing Arts.

Career
In 1993 after graduating from the Academy he joined the Bolshoi Theatre where he sang in such roles as Lensky and Lykov in The Tsar's Bride, Rodolfo in La Boheme as well starring roles of Alfredo, Faust and Pollione. In 1997 he became a recipient of the first prize at the Zimin International Vocal Competition and then became contract singer at the Vienna Volksoper where he played the role of Nemorino in Gaetano Donizetti's The Elixir of Love and other roles. Later on he performed as Italian Singer in Der Rosenkavalier at Vienna State Opera and then played as Pollione at Stockholm, Berlin and Tel Aviv Operas. He also played a role of Astrologer in a play by Nikolai Rimsky-Korsakov called The Golden Cockerel at the Royal Opera Covent Garden and then appeared as Rodolfo at both Bavarian and Wiesbaden Operas. At Deutsche Oper Berlin he appeared once as Pinkerton and then performed as Manrico at the Aalto Theatre which was followed by his appearance as Dick Johnson at the Florida Grand Opera. Currently he performs at the Canadian Opera where he performs roles of Riccardo, Calaf, and Rodolfo from Giuseppe Verdi's play called Luisa Miller and performs as a concert singer at Alte Oper Frankfurt, Essen Philharmonic and Queen Elizabeth Hall. As of 2001 he is a member of Mannheim National Theatre where he sings as Duca, Radames, and Assad from The Queen of Saba and many others.

From 2008 to 2009 he performed as Bacchus in Ariadne auf Naxos's production and the same years appeared as both Erik and Luigi in Il Tabarro and Stewa in a German city called Mannheim. In the first half of 2009 he played as Gabriele Adorno in Toronto and then appeared as Cavaradossi with the Paris Opera. In the last half of 2009 he performed in Andrea Chénier and then appeared as Riccardo at the Swedish capital. In 2010 he performed in cities such as Antwerp and Gent in one of which he appeared as Cavaradossi at Semperoper in Dresden. In 2012 he had two plays to perform in; He played a role of Herman in Tchaikovsky's The Queen of Spades and then the same year played as Calaf in Giacomo Puccini's Turandot.

Repertoire
The Golden Cockerel — Astrologer
The Queen of Saba —  Duca/Radames/Assad
The Queen of Spades — Herman
Turandot — Calaf

References

Living people
Russian tenors
Year of birth missing (living people)